Chusquea culeou, the Chilean bamboo, is a species of flowering plant in the grass family Poaceae. An evergreen bamboo native to South America, unlike most species within the genus Chusquea, it is frost-tolerant and thus widely cultivated in temperate regions.

Distribution
It is native to the Valdivian rainforests, humid temperate forests of Chile and southwestern Argentina. Chusquea culeou is a keystone species which can control patterns of forest dynamics by impeding regeneration of tree species.

Description
It has hairy lanceolate leaves with a spine on their end, and its flower is a whisk of light brown colour. The plant also produces a caryopsis fruit. Blooming occurs after variable periods, that could last 60 years. After blooming and releasing its seeds, the plant dies. They are still used by the Mapuche people for a musical instrument known as trutruca.

A feature of this Chusquea is that the stems are solid, unlike most bamboos.

Cultivation
Chusquea culeou is cultivated as an ornamental plant in gardens.

This plant has gained the Royal Horticultural Society’s Award of Garden Merit (confirmed 2017).

References

External links

Bamboo garden
Chusquea culeou - E.Desv.
Images

culeou
Flora of the Andes
Flora of Chile
Flora of Argentina
Grasses of South America
Garden plants of South America
Flora of the Valdivian temperate rainforest